QAP was a Colombian newscast aired between January 2, 1992 and December 31, 1997 on Canal A. It was produced by the programadora TV13.

History
In 1991, the journalists María Isabel Rueda and María Elvira Samper had the idea to create their own news production company. Soon, Enrique Santos Calderón (of El Tiempo newspaper and broadsheet), businessman Julio Andrés Camacho and Nobel Prize winner Gabriel García Márquez joined the project, with the goal of creating an independent newscast.

QAP had several major technological firsts. It was the first Colombian newscast to have microwave equipment and the first to broadcast from its own studios (as newly permitted in the call for bids, or licitación, of 1991).

QAP ended in New Year's Eve 1997 (Wednesday, December 31), as a result of changes in the television law that removed the extensibility of the original six-year contract (the original contract called for six years with an option to extend for another six). Because of the independence of the newscast, García Márquez was convinced that the law was written specifically to take QAP off the air. In the end, a new licitación occurred that year, and QAP opted not to participate (retracting its original proposal); its directors found that the impartiality needed for QAP to win in this new bidding cycle was lacking.

Inés María Zabaraín was the main presenter for QAP during its run on air.

Presenters and journalists 
 Paulo Laserna Phillips 
 Adriana La Rotta 
 Jorge Alfredo Vargas 
 Inés María Zabaraín 
 Ernesto McCausland †
 Paula Jaramillo
 Vicky Dávila 
 Juan Carlos Ruíz † 
 María Cristina Uribe 
 Gloria Congote † 
 D'arcy Quinn 
 Leyla Ponce de León 
 Maribel Osorio 
 Gloria Tisnés 
 Ilse Milena Borrero 
 John Portela 
 Héctor Fabio Cardona 
 Clara Elvira Ospina 
 Mariana Lloreda 
 Carlos Antonio Vélez 
 Carlos Zapata 
 Clara Estrada 
 Karl Troller 
 Ana Cristina Bueno 
 Juan Guillermo Ortiz Osorno
 María Lucía Fernández 
 Paola Turbay 
 Mónica Hernández 
 Laila Rodríguez 
 Martha Ávila 
 Richard Freddy Muñoz 
 Adriana Arboleda 
 Victor Javier Solano 
 Sergio Barbosa 
 Silvia Martínez 
 Mauricio Salcedo
 Iván Lalinde
 Maria Andrea Charry

References

TV13
1992 establishments in Colombia]
Mass media companies established in 1992
1997 disestablishments in Colombia]
Mass media companies disestablished in 1997